Melbourne University Rugby Football Club (MURFC), the oldest rugby club in Victoria, is a Foundation Club of the Victorian Rugby Union, participating in the top-tier Victorian Premier Division since 1909. MURFC is the only Foundation Club to remain continuously in the Victorian Premier Division since its inception.

Teams and players 
MURFC fields men's and women's teams in the Senior Divisions across First, Second and Third Grades, in addition to a Colts (U20) team and an over 35’s “Gents” team. Several recent MURFC players have been recruited into professional teams, notably including current Melbourne Rebels and Wallabies hooker Jordan Uelese.

Playing membership is not restricted to University of Melbourne students.

Senior Men's
Men's Premier Division teams:
Premier 1
Premier 2
Premier 3

These teams compete for the Dewar Shield in Victoria's top-tier men's grade competition.

Senior Women's
Women's Premier Division teams:
Premier 1

These teams compete for the Lindroth Cup in Victoria's top-tier women's grade competition.

Colts (U20)
Men's age-restricted Colts (U20) Division teams:
Colts 1
Colts 2

Youth Girls
Women's age-restricted competition teams:
Premier 1

Masters
Men's social competition teams:
Gents 1
Teams in this grade compete for pride.

Identity 
Nicknamed Uni or The Students, the club plays at HG Smith Oval (and surrounding fields) in Parkville.

MURFC typically fields a strong contingent of local and international players, with Ireland, England, Wales, Scotland, France, New Zealand and the Pacific Islands strongly represented.

The club's colours are black, blue and white with a strip featuring prominent blue/white hoops with black trim.

Club song
After a winning performance, MURFC men's teams typically perform the celebratory club song.

Association with University of Melbourne
The club maintains close ties with the university. Particularly during the off/pre-season, and for various strength & conditioning activities throughout the year, training sessions are often carried out on campus, making use of the University of Melbourne's extensive sporting facilities.

Students of the university that play with MURFC are eligible to compete at the annual Australian University Games; the club serves as a major conduit for student athletes wishing to participate in the Games, and is typically responsible for the training and organisation of the rugby team(s) sent to represent the University of Melbourne.

Sponsorship
Buildcorp became Principal Sponsor of MURFC in 2017 season, with a prominent logo featured on the chest of senior grade jerseys.

Notable players 
 Edward "Weary" Dunlop (Wallabies)
 Matt Cockbain (Wallabies, Reds)
 Geoff Vaughan (Wallabies)
 Fereti Sa'aga (Melbourne Rebels)
 Rob Leota (Melbourne Rebels)
 Jordan Uelese (Wallabies, Melbourne Rebels)
 Sam Jeffries (Melbourne Rebels)
 Jonah Placid (Melbourne Rebels)
 Dom Shipperley (Melbourne Rebels)

History

Origins 
In 1908, the University of Sydney challenged the students of the University of Melbourne to play a game of rugby football. A core group of players with a motivation to compete more regularly lead to the formation of the Club in the following year; officially founded in 1909, the Melbourne University Rugby Football Club (MURFC) was the oldest of five Foundation Clubs to establish the Victorian Rugby Union. This first intervarsity game and the subsequent founding of MURFC was commemorated in 2009 with an exhibition match between the Melbourne and Sydney university sides, each wearing heritage jerseys in a nod to their shared history. MURFC won its first Premiership in 1910, and is unique in having fielded a team in the top-tier of Victorian club rugby in every season since its foundation.

References

Rugby union teams in Victoria (Australia)
Rugby clubs established in 1909
Sporting clubs in Melbourne
1909 establishments in Australia
Sport at the University of Melbourne
University and college rugby union clubs in Australia
Sport in the City of Melbourne (LGA)